Monosiphonous algae are algae which consist of a single row of cells with, or without, cortication.

See also
Polysiphonous

References

Algae